Ancoraimes  (Janq'ulaymi; Aymara for "white branch") is a location in the La Paz Department in Bolivia. It is the seat of the Ancoraimes Municipality, the second municipal section of the Omasuyos Province.

References 

 Instituto Nacional de Estadistica de Bolivia

Populated places in La Paz Department (Bolivia)